Pleisiolaelaps is a genus of mites in the family Laelapidae.

Species
 Pleisiolaelaps miniopterus Womersley, 1957

References

Laelapidae